The Crown is a pub at 174 Richmond Road, Twickenham, London TW1. It is a Grade II listed building, dating back to the late 18th century.

References

External links
 
 

18th-century establishments in England
Grade II listed buildings in the London Borough of Richmond upon Thames
Grade II listed pubs in London
Pubs in the London Borough of Richmond upon Thames
Twickenham